In the 1959 Universal Pictures theatrical short "Space Mouse", producer Walter Lantz introduced three new cartoon animal characters: a cat named Doc and two mice named Hickory and Dickory.  Hickory, Dickory, and Doc appeared together in two more shorts.  Doc subsequently appeared solo in six more cartoons.

Filmography of Hickory, Dickory, and Doc

See also
List of Walter Lantz cartoons
List of Walter Lantz cartoon characters

References

External links

The Walter Lantz-o-Pedia

Fictional anthropomorphic characters
Universal Pictures cartoons and characters
Walter Lantz Productions shorts
Fictional cats
Fictional mice and rats
Film characters introduced in 1959
Animated characters introduced in 1959
Walter Lantz Productions cartoons and characters
Fictional trios